The 1947–48 Scottish League Cup final was played on 25 October 1947 and replayed on 1 November 1947. It was the final of the second Scottish League Cup competition, and it was contested by East Fife and Falkirk. The first match was a goalless draw, necessitating a reply that East Fife won 4–1, mainly thanks to a hat-trick by Davie Duncan.

Match details

Replay

References

External links
 Soccerbase (first game)
 Soccerbase (replay)

1947 10
League Cup Final
East Fife F.C. matches
Falkirk F.C. matches
1940s in Glasgow
October 1947 sports events in the United Kingdom